Striphnopteryx is a monotypic moth genus in the family Eupterotidae described by Hans Daniel Johan Wallengren in 1858. Its only species, Striphnopteryx edulis, was described by Jean Baptiste Boisduval in 1847. It is found in South Africa, where it has been recorded from KwaZulu-Natal and Mpumalanga.

References

Moths described in 1847
Striphnopteryginae
Monotypic moth genera
Moths of Sub-Saharan Africa
Lepidoptera of South Africa